Ana C. Ayora (born July 8, 1983) is an American actress best known for her role as Nuria Soto in the 2013 film The Big Wedding and as Deputy Nina Cruz in the Cinemax original series Banshee. She also appeared in the 2019 film Captain Marvel.

Biography
Ana Ayora was born in Florida to parents from Colombia, specifically from the Antioquia Department. Ayora grew up multilingual, with English and Spanish as her primary languages as she would visit Colombia during the summer. She had taken up ballet at a young age, but by 20, she had to give it up due to a ligament injury. Ayora had by then turned her attention to acting after being suggested to by a friend in college. Ayora stated, "The next thing I knew I was booking commercials. That's what I realized I liked being in front of the camera acting, rather than other modeling."

Despite having been a fan of films like Annie at a young age, Ayora never saw herself initially as an actress. "I must say that while growing up I was not a big fan of cinema or television...I was very social and I spent more outside the house than lying in an armchair in front of a screen. But now I'm here, in this job, you see how fate ends up marking your path in one way or another." Her career took off when she landed small roles in projects such as Marley & Me and Castle.

She would continue to work day and night jobs at American Apparel and a club called Touch, the former of which she would leave during lunch time to audition for roles. Ayora eventually landed the role of Nuria Soto in The Big Wedding which became her breakout role. Ayora lacked a traditional Latino accent and had to perform with one for the film. She joined the cast of Captain Marvel which is part of the successful Marvel Cinematic Universe franchise.

Filmography

References

External links

1983 births
Living people
American film actresses
American television actresses
American people of Colombian descent
Actresses from Miami
Hispanic and Latino American actresses
21st-century American women